Cape Bouguer Wilderness Protection Area is a protected area located on the south coast of Kangaroo Island in South Australia about  south-west of Kingscote.  The wilderness protection area was proclaimed in October 1993 under the Wilderness Protection Act 1992 in order to ‘protect and preserve the outstandingly high wilderness qualities of the area.’  It was created on land excised from the Kelly Hill Conservation Park.  It is classified as an IUCN Category Ib protected area.

See also
 Protected areas of South Australia
 Karatta, South Australia

References

External links
Entry for Cape Bouguer Wilderness Protection Area on protected planet

Wilderness areas of South Australia
Protected areas established in 1993
1993 establishments in Australia
Protected areas of Kangaroo Island